El C.I.D. is an ITV television crime drama comedy that ran for three seasons from 7 February 1990 until 2 March 1992. The series starred Alfred Molina as Bernard Blake, a C.I.D. officer who takes early retirement and moves to Spain where he and his work partner, Douglas Bromley (John Bird), a retired records officer, keep an eye on the ex-pat community of British gangsters. As well as settling into life on the Costa Del Sol, storylines featured the pair helping out a local private eye, Delgado (Simón Andreu) to investigate cases.

The series was highly publicised following criticism of Spain's extradition treaty with the UK, which was featured heavily in the newspapers during the series' run. Before the third series, Molina left the cast, and was subsequently replaced by Amanda Redman, who joined the series as the daughter of Bird's character, Bromley. The series also co-starred Kenneth Cranham as a notorious British gangster who fled to Spain. Scriptwriter Jimmy McGovern wrote episodes for both the first and second series. The title is a play on El Cid.

Cast
 Alfred Molina as Bernard Blake
 John Bird as Douglas Bromley
 Simón Andreu as Delgado
 Tony Haygarth as Frank
 Donald Churchill as Metcalf
 María Isbert as Senora Sanchez
 Kenneth Cranham as Gus Mercer
 Amanda Redman as Rosie Bromley
 Niven Boyd as Graham
 Viviane Vives as Mercedes
 Fiona Gillies as Linda
 Paul Brooke as James Henley Dodd

Episodes

Series 1 (1990)

Series 2 (1991)

Series 3 (1992)

References

External links

1990s British comedy-drama television series
1990s British crime drama television series
1990 British television series debuts
1992 British television series endings
ITV television dramas
Television series by ITV Studios
Television shows produced by Granada Television
English-language television shows
Television shows set in Spain